Farouk al-Fishawy (5 February 1952 – 25 July 2019) was an Egyptian film and television actor. He was known for Al-Mashbouh (1981).

Early life 
He was born as Mohamed Farouk al-Fishawy in Sirs El-Layan, Monufia Governorate on 5 February 1952. He was one of the youngest of his 3 brothers and 2 sisters. His father died when he was 11 years old and his elder brother Rashad al-Fishawy took care of him and raised him. He received his bachelor's degree in general medicine and before that he received his Bachelor of Arts from Ain Shams University.

Career 
He started his career in the 1970s and starred in dozens of films and television series. He worked in more than 130 films, including al-Qatila (1991), al-Tufan (1985), al-Rasif (1993), Mutarada Fi al-Mamnu (1993), Ghadan Sa'antaqem (1980), Hanafy al-Obaha (1990), La Tasalni Man Ana (1984), Siriyun Lilghaya (1986), Nessa Khalf al-Qodban (1986), Qahwat al-Muaridi (1981), el-Mar'a el-Hadeedeya (1987), Fatat Min Israeel (1999), al-Fadiha (1992) and Dik al-Barabir (1992). He also worked in TV dramas.

Personal life
Al-Fishawy married three times. His first wife was actress Samia al-Alfi, from 1972 until their divorce in 1992. They had two sons, Omar and Ahmed. His second wife was actress Soheir Ramzi; they married in 1992 and separated after five years, subsequently divorcing. His third wife was non-celebrity, Nouran Mansor and separated in 1998. He also had a relationship with actress Laila Elwi, but they did not marry.

Illness and death
On 3 October 2018, Farouk al-Fishawy, after receiving a shield from the Alexandria International Film Festival, announced that he had cancer.

Al-Fishawy succumbed to liver cancer on 25 July 2019 at the age of 67.

References

1952 births
2019 deaths
People from Monufia Governorate
20th-century Egyptian male actors
21st-century Egyptian male actors
Deaths from cancer in Egypt
Deaths from liver cancer
Ain Shams University alumni
Egyptian male film actors
Egyptian male television actors